Andrew Hunter or Andy Hunter may refer to:

Sports
Andrew Hunter (British swimmer) (born 1986), British swimmer who was a medalist in the Commonwealth Games
Andrew Hunter (Irish swimmer) (born 1952), Irish swimmer
Andy Hunter (footballer, born 1864) (1864–1888), Scottish footballer (Aston Villa FC)
Andy Hunter (footballer, born 1883) (1883–1933), Irish football forward
Drew Hunter (born 1997), American distance runner

Other
Andrew Hunter (British politician) (born 1943), British politician and a member of the Orange Order
Andrew Hunter (lawyer) (1804–1888), attorney in Charles Town, Virginia, who prosecuted John Brown for the raid on Harpers Ferry
Andrew Hunter (Methodist preacher) (1813–1902), Methodist preacher often called "Father of Methodism in Arkansas"
Andrew Hunter (minister) (1743–1809), Moderator of the General Assembly of the Church of Scotland
Andrew Hunter (preacher) (died 1638), Scottish minister and political agent
Andrew Hunter (priest) (born 1957), South African Anglican clergyman
Andrew J. Hunter (1831–1913), U.S. Representative from Illinois
Andrew P. Hunter, American defense official
Andy Hunter (DJ) (born 1974), British Christian DJ and composer of electronic dance music
Andy Hunter (EastEnders), a fictional character from the BBC soap opera EastEnders, played by Michael Higgs